Vusi "Computer" Lamola (born 13 March 1950)  in Johannesburg, Gauteng is a retired South African association football player who played in South Africa for Orlando Preston Brothers, Germiston City and Kaizer Chiefs.

He was nicknamed "Computer" during the 1973 Life Cup final against Orlando Pirates when he replaced Ace Ntsoelengoe in the 80th minute. Trailing 2-0 he set up two goals to send the game to extra time and setup five more to win 7-3. He was named "Computer" for his vision and fast thinking.

He joined Edmonton Drillers in 1980. He played 7 NASL matches and had two assists wearing jersey number 18.

International career
Lamola represented South Africa in 1977 versus Rhodesia.

References 

1950 births
Living people
Sportspeople from Soweto
South African soccer players
South African expatriate soccer players
South Africa international soccer players
Association football midfielders
Kaizer Chiefs F.C. players
Edmonton Drillers (1979–1982) players
North American Soccer League (1968–1984) players
Expatriate soccer players in Canada
South African expatriate sportspeople in Canada